The Rice Valley Wilderness is a wilderness area near Blythe and Rice in the Mojave Desert region of California, managed by the Bureau of Land Management.

The 41,777-acre wilderness includes portions of the Big Maria Mountains, along with a stretch of sand dunes that is part of one of the state's largest dune systems. Congress designated the area as part of the 1994 California Desert Protection Act.

References 

 
 Sand Dune locations, north of Big Maria Mountains & southwest of the Riverside Mountains, southeast Rice Valley, a wind stricture point: (BLM map for Riverside Mountains Wilderness, northwest Big Maria's map), 

Bureau of Land Management areas in California
Wilderness areas of California
Protected areas of Riverside County, California